The Ch'ŏnma-ho or spelled as Chonma-ho (Chosŏn'gŭl: 천마호; Hanja: 天馬號 meaning 'Pegasus') is one of North Korea's secretive indigenous main battle tank designs. The tank is also known by the name of 천리마 전차 (千里馬 or the "Chollima Tank"). The original Ch'ŏnma-ho is based on the Soviet T-62.  There are at least five different operational versions of the Ch'ŏnma-ho. Since its inception, the Ch'ŏnma-ho has apparently undergone several extensive upgrades. Little public information is available about this tank, and its most recent public appearance was the 70th Anniversary Parade held in Pyongyang, North Korea, on 10 October 2015, celebrating the 70th anniversary of North Korea's ruling party.

Background
After the Armistice Agreement of the Korean War in 1953, North Korea found itself in need of much more modern equipment.  Prior to the start of open hostilities, North Korea had acquired 379 T-34s from the Soviet Union.  According to a report to the United States Congress in 2000, the North Korean military had up to 2,000 tanks garrisoned along the Korean Demilitarized Zone (DMZ) alone.  This means that between the years 1954 and 2000 the North Koreans were able to stockpile over 2,000 tanks, including Soviet T-55s and T-62s and Chinese Type 59s and Type 62s. A North Korean general who defected to South Korea also said in the early 2000s that due to a lack of fuel military exercises are limited.  It is also possible that many of the older vehicles used by the North Korean People's Army are not well maintained and have suffered from years of disuse.

Although not much is known about the North Korean military after the Korean War, it is known that they have many different types of tanks.  These include the Type 59 and Type 62, as well as the T-54, T-62 and possibly the T-72.  The T-54 was probably sold to North Korea between 1960 and 1970, while the T-62 was reportedly sold in the mid-1980s. Unconfirmed reports indicate a few T-72s may have been provided to North Korea in the early 1990s. It is known that the North Koreans still make limited use of vintage World War II T-34s as well as the Soviet-era PT-76/85 amphibious tanks. Up to 5,400 tanks are coupled with at least 12,000 self-propelled artillery pieces and thousands of other towed artillery pieces of unknown type and quantity.  The North Koreans also have at least nine different types of armoured personnel carriers, including the BMP-1.

Role
The Ch'ŏnma-ho has been issued to North Korea's premier armored formations, and would lead the initial attempts to break through South Korean defences.  Other armour is relegated to a secondary role in this corps or to North Korea's four mechanized corps. To underscore North Korea's concept of combined arms and the importance of armour, and therefore the importance of the Ch'ŏnma-ho, North Korea's sole armour corps is directly grouped with two mechanized corps and a single artillery corps.  However, this forms the second echelon of North Korea's deployment to the DMZ, with the first echelon composed of four infantry corps, and the rest in strategic reserve.  This may also play a part in a defensive strategy, as the North Korean army is arrayed in depth, and the armour might be strategically placed to both provide offensive power and a second echelon composed of mobile defences to plug a South Korean breakthrough along the DMZ.

The Ch'ŏnma-ho is a product of North Korea's approach of Juche, or self-reliance, which also includes several indigenous self-propelled artillery pieces.  The idea of juche comes from a North Korean sentiment of abandonment by their allies, China and Soviet Union/Russia. This accounts for their drive towards overproduction and for recent North Korean nuclear developments, as well as the production of long-range missiles which provide North Korea with its longer range striking power. This all manifests itself within the 'triangle' of North Korean military development – armour, artillery and missiles.  In fact, this seems reminiscent from Soviet military theory, including the application of overwhelming artillery support and the use of large amounts of armour to create a breakthrough after the initial artillery disruption.  In that sense, North Korean military strategy is very mobile, and the large numbers of tanks underscores this.  The Ch'ŏnma-ho is an attempt to partially address the technology gap between its current dated tank forces and South Korean K1A1 and the US M1 Abrams tank.

Production history

There might be two versions of the Ch'ŏnma-ho 1: the copy of the Syrian T-62 in the late 1970s, and an original copy exported by the Soviet Union which may be the T-62D. The Ch'ŏnma-ho is not related to the Chinese Type 62. Despite its relation to the T-62, the original version of the Ch'ŏnma-ho had thinner armour and was consequently lighter. This version of the tank has two distinctive bolts on the bottom portion of the upper glacis plate. The Ch'ŏnma-ho I name was also given (at least by the West and South Korean white papers) to the imported T-62, which was later slightly upgraded to the IM version. Although no dates are available, the Ch'ŏnma-ho I was later upgraded to the II version with a laser rangefinder above the mantlet. According to online sources this Ch'ŏnma-ho was upgraded once again, probably in the mid-1980s, with a 'boom shield'. The Ch'ŏnma-ho III might have also seen an armour upgrade with the addition of full-hull skirting and a new thermal shroud for the original 115 mm main gun.

The most modern Ch'ŏnma-ho tanks seem to be the IV and V versions. The Ch'ŏnma-ho IV is fitted with what resemble light explosive reactive armour bricks. Judging by photographs, these are mounted specifically on the turret side, with at least eight bricks per side. The Ch'ŏnma-ho IV is reported to be upgraded with new side-mounted smoke launchers. North Korea is rumored to have received a few examples of the T-72s after 1992, and possibly a single T-90S main battle tank in August 2001. Any conclusion regarding whether the Ch'ŏnma-ho has been upgraded to the standards of either the T-72 or the T-90S would be highly speculative at this point.

Around 90% of the Ch'ŏnma-ho is indigenously produced.  There is evidence, however, that North Korea has purchased entire engines, or engine components, from Slovakia. Furthermore, it is thought that ceramic components, possibly for an upgraded armour scheme, are from foreign sources, as well as fire control components. It is not clear how much is indigenously produced in regards to the different variants of the Ch'ŏnma-ho. The figure of 90% could have changed considerably between the original Ch'ŏnma-ho I and the Ch'ŏnma-ho V, although it should be kept into consideration that many of the major features are probably purchased from abroad – especially for the upgrades of the tanks. It is not clear how much North Korea can afford on producing on its own, or how much it can afford to import for that matter. It is thought that North Korea is considerably low on resources, especially money, and this belief has been perpetuated after North Korea's nuclear test incidents in 2006. It is possible that Russia is supplying North Korea with several components for North Korea's tank projects which include the Ch'ŏnma-ho and quite possibly the M-2002, although no hard evidence can support this claim.

In August 2010 North Korean media revealed images of its new main battle tank the Pokpung-ho (also known as the M-2002), which had been rumoured to have been under development since the early 1990s and to have undergone performance trials in 2002.  While precise details of its capabilities remain unclear, the Pokpung-ho appears to be simply a further improvement of the Ch'ŏnma-ho.

Deployment history
It is unknown which units of the Korean People's Army might be outfitted with the Ch'ŏnma-ho. It is clear that the Ch'ŏnma-ho is a general replacement for previously employed tanks, including the T-34, T-62 and Type 59 medium tanks.  It is very possible that the Ch'ŏnma-ho will equip the spearhead and elite of North Korea's armoured forces.  They are apparently deployed in sufficient numbers to be strategically significant.  There might be as many as 800 T-62s in addition to the over 1000 Ch'ŏnma-ho's in the North Korean army, of which any number could be one of the five Ch'ŏnma-ho variants.

Ethiopia purchased and used Chonma-ho tanks against rebels during the Ethiopian Civil War. Some Chonma-ho tanks were found abandoned when rebels overran the capital Addis Ababa.

Models
 Ch'ŏnma-ho I - Copy of the T-62.
 Ch'ŏnma-ho II - Similar to a stock T-62, but has several differences, has a laser rangefinder housed in a blister above the main gun atop the turret (though the original T-62 does have a laser rangefinder, the Ch’onma-ho 1 does not – and the laser rangefinder of the T-62 is an integral part of the fire control system, rather than an add-on part like on the Ch’onma-ho 2). Fitted with spaced appliqué armor on the turret in a ring around the turret ("boom shield") – thin plates of steel welded onto the turret atop bars  provide a space between the shields and the turret armor to provide the equivalent of spaced armor, as well as doubling as turret baskets for crew equipment and vehicle equipment.
 Ch'ŏnma-ho III - A simple progressive upgrade of the Ch’onma-ho 2, with a thermal sleeve for the main gun and armored track skirts added. It is possible, but considered unlikely, that lugs for ERA have been added since its introduction; if they are present, they would be most likely found on the glacis and turret sides. A night vision upgrade.
 Ch'ŏnma-ho IV  - Greatly upgraded armor protection, including composite armor on the glacis and turret front, and appliqué or thickened armor elsewhere. Even the appliqué and/or thickened armor appears to be more advanced than earlier models, does not appear to have gained a huge amount of weight. A ballistic computer was added to the fire control suite, and the fire control suite has been integrated into a complete system rather than being a patchwork of upgrades. Gun stabilization has been improved. Radios are  improved, and the suspension beefed up. The new engine is a 750-horsepower model which can lay a thick, oily smoke screen by injecting diesel fuel into its exhaust. Lugs for ERA (similar to the Russian Kontakt-3 ERA) added to turret sides, and lugs on the armored track skirts and on the glacis. Lugs for ERA bricks on the turret front. On the side of the turret, clusters of four smoke grenade launchers; at the rear of the turret another cluster of four smoke grenade launchers, firing backwards instead of forwards.
Ch'ŏnma-ho V (also known as Ch'ŏnma-98) Welded turret of increased size, possibly has thermal imager and new ballistic computer.
 Ch'ŏnma-ho VI - Western designation for Chonma-215.
 Ch'ŏnma-214  - Add on armor on the sides, hexagonal applique armor in front of driver's hatch, rubber sheets attached to lower front glacis compared to Chonma-98.
 Ch'ŏnma-ho II - Designation for imported T-62
 Ch'ŏnma-ho IM - Improved imported T-62

Variants
 Ch'ŏnma-ho ARV – Armoured recovery vehicle with a casemate superstructure
 Ch'ŏnma-ho Command – Command variant of the tank with a fake main gun
 Juche-po – Self-propelled artillery gun on a modified Ch'ŏnma-ho chassis.  The Juche-po is an improvement over the Tokchon artillery piece, which was mounted on an ATS-59 chassis.  There are at least four M1991 versions of the Juche-po, each mounting a different gun: the D-30 122 mm, D-74 122 mm, the M-46 130 mm and the ML-20 152 mm howitzer. A fifth M1992 version is armed with the SM-4-1 130 mm howitzer.  These artillery pieces can be identified by their six road wheels, as compared to the Tok-Ch'ŏn's five, and a prominent recoil cylinder which protrudes from the turret. Another major difference is that the Juche-Po has a fully encased rounded turret, as opposed to the older open-topped self-propelled artillery pieces used previously.

Operators

Current operators
 - Unknown number of Chonma-hos bought in the early 80s, most shown in a 1987 military parade.
  - 150 ordered in 1981 from North Korea and delivered between 1982 and 1985.
  - 470 were produced between 1980 and 1989 (the original order was placed in 1976). Overall more than 1,200 were produced. as many as 1,000 are currently in service alongside roughly 800 T-62s.

See also

Pokpung-ho
Defense industry of North Korea

Notes

References
 
 Geibel, Adam (2002)  Armor - July 8, 2002 strategypage.com
 Hetherington, Jay A. (2004), North Korea: Through the Looking Glass, Strom Thurmond Institute.
 Hodge, Homer T. (2003) North Korea's Military Strategy, Parameters, US Army War College
 Isenberg, David, "North Korea rolls out new tank", Asian Times.
 Macintyre, Donald "Kim's War Machine", TIME Asia.
 Warford, James (1998). "The Ch'ŏnma-ho Main Battle Tank: A Look at the Present and Future of North Korea's 'Flying Horse'" in Armor, September 1, 2005. Fort Knox, KY: US Army Armor Center. ISSN 0004-2420.
 2000 Report to Congress: Military Situation on the Korean Peninsula defenselink.mil
 Kharkiv Modernization of T-62 tank Kharkiv Morozov website.
 North Korean Military Capabilities about.com

External links
 North Korea errors report

Post–Cold War main battle tanks
Main battle tanks of the Cold War
Main battle tanks of North Korea
Main battle tanks of Iran
Korea–Soviet Union relations
Military vehicles introduced in the 1970s